, also known as Earth Defender! Mao-chan, is a 26-episode anime created by  Xebec.

It stars three eight-year-old girls, Mao, Misora and Sylvia, as they try to defend the earth against invading aliens. The world's defense has fallen to unlikely straits because the aliens are excessively cute, of which combat engagements are televised: if the forces battling the aliens were not cute themselves, the general public would revolt, as it would be seen as "bullying". Consequently, three military leaders chose their granddaughters to be the defenders, fittingly, becoming a team even cuter than the aliens. They each have a clover-shaped badge that enables them to transform. (This transformation provides no apparent special ability.)

The series itself is rife with parodies and references, particularly to Akamatsu's earlier work Love Hina. The girls' commanding officer bears a resemblance to Naru Narusegawa from Love Hina. See also below in the characters, and anime episode 20, manga chapters 17 and 25.

It was one of Tony Pope's last voice acting roles before his death in 2004.

Characters
Mao Onigawara
Voiced by: Kimiko Koyama (Japanese), Sandy Fox (English)
Mao is the girl with pink pigtails held by red bows, who defends Japan from the ground by using a plastic tank (the tank was officially named 'White Tiger,' but she refers to it as 'Mi-kun' because when she was little, she had a kitten she called Mi-kun, but it got lost in a river while she was playing near it one day. She re-named the tank that so it seemed it was still there). As revealed in assorted Physical Education scenes, she is a very slow runner. Her physical ability is minimal, but she more than makes up for it with her total seriousness in the spirit of defense. It is revealed that she has no mother and her father is busy with his own work as a secret spy for the Defense Forces. Her least favorite food is carrots. Her clover pin is green.

Her baton initiates the Defense Barrier.

Misora Tsukishima
Voiced by: Yūya Yoshikawa (Japanese), Kari Wahlgren (English)
Misora has purple-blue hair with a blue headband, and defends Japan from the air using an airplane. Her mother (and presumably her father, as well) is a diplomat, and thus is never home. As a result of this, she lives with her grandfather. Her clover pin is blue. Her transformed outfit features a pair of white-feathered wings on her back, which she can use to fly. She's fairly mature and the type who can come up with ideas all the time but physically can't carry them out. Misora's also an Honors student. In the anime, she is known for ending most of her sentences with "...I must say!" while in the manga, she says "Dont'cha know" and "If ya please" compared to her Japanese "arimasu."

Her baton activates the Reflection Barrier.

Silvia Maruyama
Voiced by: Yui Horie (Japanese), Julie Maddalena (English)
Silvia, nicknamed "Sylvie", who has a low grayish-black ponytail held by a green bow, defends Japan from the sea using a submarine. Despite her occupation as a member of the Japanese Maritime Self-Defense Force (JMSDF), she cannot swim. She has a somewhat curious affection for tangerines, and is frequently depicted eating them. Her clover pin is grey. She's Russian and a quarter Japanese despite speaking with a British accent in the English dub, she acts casual and even a little loopy. In the manga, she's crazy about fishing. Her transformation is different from the others, because right after the hat goes on her head, it flies up a bit, and the red part extends and droops down. Her name in the English-language subtitles is alternately written 'Sylvia", though the opening credits show her name as "Silvia". In episode 20 when they come face to face with Naru, Silvia makes plenty of allusions to Love Hina (such as, "When I close my eyes, memories from another life come back to me") because the Japanese voice actress who played Naru plays Silvia, hence, the past allusions, though the same voice actress isn't the case for the english version. In the anime, she is known to referring to herself as "I, the officer..." or the girls as "We, the officers...." In the manga, she uses a "surfer" dialect, using terms such as calling Mao and Misora "dudettes" or "girlfriends" in comparison to her Japanese use of "-yan" instead of "-chan." She has a Love Interest named Taro.

Her baton activates the Restriction Barrier.

Kagome Mishima
Voiced by: Miki Nagasawa (Japanese), Dorothy Elias-Fahn (English)
A Colonel in the Ground Self-Defense Force with an IQ of 250. She is assigned to be Mao-chan's homeroom teacher in order to watch over her for her (Mao's) grandfather who she is madly in love with. In the manga, she is revealed to be the striking image of Rikushiro's late wife, Kunie Onigawara. Despite her better judgement, she will do anything for Rikushiro if asked (and might regret the decision later). As she's pulling double duty with being the United Defense Force's commanding officer and the girls' homeroom teacher, she tends to be tired out a lot and is often asleep in class.

Bears a striking resemblance to Naru Narusegawa from Love Hina minus one hair antennae. The resemblance is noted upon in ep 20 when they come face to face with Naru, and as an added bonus for the english version, the same voice actress for Naru plays Kagome Mishima as well.

After the climactic battle in the manga, she is seen to be still teaching as Mao-chan's homeroom teacher three years later.

Yuriko Ōzora
Voiced by:  (Japanese), Wendee Lee (English)
Yuriko, also known as Yuriko-senpai, is the student council president of her high school. She is actually half-alien (her father was a human, while her mother was an alien); as a result, she has a pair of cat ears that appear when she is nervous or upset. Due to her alien heritage, she attempts to further the Cute Alien's cause. She seems to suffer from an inferiority complex, which frequently hinders her mission. Yuriko also seems to be a fan of Mao-chan and her friends, which often prevents her from hurting them. In the anime, she even assumes the mantle of Lady of Purple Lily when Mao-chan and the others can't handle the current alien threats. In the manga, her hair is blonde, but in the anime it is red. After being branded and imprisoned as traitors with Chinami, she rebels against the alien's forces. Three years later, she's seen to be working with Chinami at their co-owned hot springs. She no longer hides her cat ears.

Chinami Noki
Voiced by: Ai Iura (Japanese), Kari Wahlgren (English)
Chinami is the vice president of the student council in the anime; thus, she is technically lower in rank than Yuriko, but she behaves as if it were the other way around, giving Yuriko orders and formulating plans on her own. However, in the manga, she is secretary of the student council. Chinami is presumably half-alien, as she has cat ears identical to Yuriko's (but Chinami's ears do not appear nearly as often as Yuriko's do). At first, she's secretly jealous of Yuriko's carefree personality and always being in the spotlight, but after winning the title of Queen of the Beach, she realizes that she prefers being a supporting character than a main one. After being branded and imprisoned as traitors with Yuriko, she rebels against the alien's forces. Three years later, she's seen to be working with Yuriko at their co-owned hot springs. Unlike Yuriko, she is not yet brave enough to reveal her cat ears to the public.

Rikushiro Onigawara
Voiced by: Akio Nojima (Japanese), Michael McConnohie (English)
Rikushiro is Mao's grandfather, and he gave her the green clover-shaped pin as a present for her eighth birthday. He is also the head of the Japanese Ground Self-Defense Force (JGSDF). Rikushiro is something of a doting grandfather (he had a weapon-free tank built especially for Mao, saying that his granddaughter deserved only the best toys), but he insists that Mao address him as 'Chief of Staff' instead of 'Grandpa.' His name is a play on words meaning "warrior of the land."

Sorajiro Tsukishima
Voiced by: Kiyonobu Suzuki (Japanese), Tony Pope (credited as Anthony Mozdy) (English)
Sorajiro is Misora's grandfather and the head of the Japanese Air Self-Defense Force (JASDF). His daughter (Misora's mother) is constantly away from home, so Misora lives with Sorajiro. He is always depicted as carrying what appears to be a plush-doll version of Captain Juzo Okita from Space Battleship Yamato. Rikushiro and Sorajiro have been rivals since their college days. Sorajiro enlisted his granddaughter in the Air Defence Forces just to keep up with Rikushiro.

Adalbert Von Marayuma
Voiced by: Takashi Taniguchi (Japanese), Ron Allen (English)
Adalbert is Sylvie's grandfather and the head of the Japanese Maritime Self-Defense Force (JMSDF). He is of German descent, and is almost always shown smoking a large cigar. Adalbert has a mischievous personality. Like Sylvia, he cannot swim either.

Emi Uehara
Voiced by: Machiko Toyoshima (Japanese)

Shoko Akasaka
Voiced by: Machiko Toyoshima (Japanese)

Mio Nanba
Voiced by: Chiaki Takahashi (Japanese)

Keinosuke Urashima / Keitaro Urashima

Voiced by: Yūji Ueda (Japanese), Derek Stephen Prince (English)
He has failed the Tokyo University entrance exam four times. Misora encounters him in the woods on Mt. Fuji in manga chapter 17 just as he is about to fail to commit suicide for the fourteenth time. Misora cheers him up just in time for him to receive 40 e-mail messages from the people who love him. Keinosuke mentions getting mail from his fiancée Nana, from Motoko and even from Tama-chan. Although he looks very much like the Keitaro from Love Hina, he is only referred to as Keitaro in the anime.
His only appearance in the anime is Episode 24 on Mao's TV where Naru uses a "Naru Punch" on him. However, he is briefly mentioned by Naru in the Episode 20 preview.

Nana Nanasegawa / Naru Narusegawa

Voiced by: Yui Horie (Japanese), Dorothy Elias-Fahn (English)
Appears twice in the show (once in ep 20, another in ep 25 on Mao's TV) as a carry over from Love Hina taking place after the aforementioned show. She's turned the Hinata dorms into an inn with her husband Keitaro, and is another victim of the cute aliens' shenanigans.
The manga seems to take place in a parallel world that contains many things that resemble Love Hina. In chapter 25 the Defense Force travels to Hinata Ryokan (hot springs resort) and are greeted by its proprietress Nana Nanasegawa and her fiancé Keinosuke Urashima. Nana looks very much like Naru in Love Hina. Based on the email she sent Keinosuke in chapter 17 she also has the same short temper.

Misorako "Kūko" Tsukushima
Voiced by: Tomoe Hanba (Japanese)
Misora's mother and an ambassador of Japan. She carries a plush doll of Yuki Mori from Space Battleship Yamato. In the anime, she is seen to be equipped with a packable glider that she can summon at will.

Carol Cameron
Voiced by: Masayo Kurata (Japanese), Michelle Ruff (English)
(Anime only) Carol is an 8 year old American Defense Force member who came to Japan to receive her support mecha armor developed by Toko. Upon meeting Mao-chan and company she shows admiration of them by kissing all three girls. Carol has a very outgoing personality. Her popularity with the chiefs of staff especially Rikushiro Onigawara made Kagome Mishima a bit jealous. Carol joins Kagome Mishima's class as an observer which surprises Mishima mistaking her age as junior high or high school. Carol excels both in academics and athletics, particularly soccer. Her only flaw is that she swoons when she sees a cute alien, getting her kidnapped and rescued by Mao-chan, subsequently learning the importance of the defense spirit. Carol Cameron's character design is based on Love Hina'''s Sara McDougal.

Rikukichi OnigawaraVoiced by: Kōji Haramaki (Japanese)
Mao's father. In the anime, he is only seen once in the second episode. However, in the manga, he is actually a double-agent for the Ground Defense Force, spying on the aliens until the time came to reveal himself. He is seen to be disguised in a dinosaur-type alien costume. He usually wears a veil over his face as to protect his identity.

Kuniko OnigawaraVoiced by: Satsuki Yukino (Japanese)
Mao's mother who died before the beginning of the series. Although she makes no appearance in the anime or revealed in the manga, she does give spiritual support to Mao-chan through her clover pin. She asks Yuriko to help defend Mao-chan, resulting in the Lady of Purple Lady identity.

Prime MinisterVoiced by: Jun'ichi Sugawara (Japanese), David Orosco (English)
Usually seen always wiping his face with a handkerchief, he cares about the well-being of Japan and tends to be a pushover. Whenever the United Defense Forces need to summon their Type-2 Gear or activate the Unified Defense Barrier, public support needs to be high enough before he can approve of their use. In the manga, his eyes are censored out with a black bar for a while.

In the manga, he is eventually replaced with another Prime Minister, who happens to have a grudge with Rikushiro Onigawara for something that happened 60 years ago. This Prime Minister does everything possible to discredit the United Defense Forces and replace them with his own trio of elementary students, The Three Aces Squadron, Haru, Natsu and Tou (which means "spring," "summer," and "winter," respectively). However, they are 11-year-old boys that use firearms instead of trying to solve the alien threat peacefully like the girls. It eventually becomes apparent that their "defense of Japan" are publicity stunts and cannot handle a real alien threat. The girls are eventually reinstated.

Kiku Ichimonji IIIVoiced by: Yuri Shiratori (Japanese)
(Anime only) A small puppy-like robot on skis, built for the purpose of detecting Cute Aliens. It barks if it detects a Cute Alien. This was built by Toko when the aliens stopped sending advance warning letters. Girls tend to find him irresistibly cute. So much that it once made Mi-kun feel neglected by Mao-chan and ran away from home until he returned to save Mao and the girls. Although he can detect aliens, he has no combat capabilities whatsoever and is usually needed to be carried around.

Ichiro StekiVoiced by Hirofumi Nojima (Japanese), Derek Stephen Prince (English)
(Anime only) A friend of the Prime Minister, Kagome is forced into an arranged marriage with him. He seems charming enough, but Kagome's heart lies elsewhere. After the marriage certificates are destroyed by the United Defense Barrier, he changes his mind about the marriage not being able to cope with Kagome's crazy lifestyle.

Galaxy the Great / Emperor GalacticaVoiced by: Keiichi Sonobe (Japanese), David Orosco (English)
The leader of the Cute Aliens and a fanatical collector of Japanese culture and landmarks. He loves hot springs and is usually seen soaking in one. His headquarters is located on the moon. In the manga, he is eventually befriended by Mao-chan and returns all the Japanese landmarks that he's stolen. Three years later, he's seen to be working with Yuriko and Chinami in their public bathhouse.

Tokusaburo "Toko" TokugawaVoiced by: Naoki Bandō (Japanese)
Toko is the chief engineer of the Ground Defense Force. He and his staff of female mechanics pieced together Mi-kun initially codenamed Byakko (White Tiger). He also created Kiku Ichimonji III, Kagome Mishima's support mecha Seiryuu (Blue Dragon) and Carol Cameron's support mecha suit.

Mayumi A.Voiced by: Ryokichi Takahashi (Japanese), Julie Ann Taylor (English)
Mayumi is the only operator named among the three Love Hina Motoko look alike operators. She is a member of the Japanese Air Self-Defense Force (JASDF). Her nickname is "Mayu-Mayu."

Little KingVoiced by:'' Kurumi Mamiya (Japanese)
(Anime only) The little son of Emperor Galactica. Despite the fact the Cute Aliens stole it in the first place, Mao-chan gave her precious doll Kuniko to him to protect his smile. He doesn't appear in the manga.

Mi-kun
Mao-chan's toy-like support mecha. It is 1:1 scale German Tiger Tank. Initially codenamed by her grandfather as Byakko (White Tiger). Named after Mao-chan's lost kitten (later revealed to be the alien Omega), it has a protective nature of her. It was temporarily given weapons to protect Mao-chan, but later learned that Mao liked it better when there weren't any. Mao-chan gives Mi-kun one of her ribbons to wear as a symbolism of their friendship. Because it's a plastic model, it has no interior, so any passengers have to ride on top.

Hayate
Misora's toy-like support mecha. It is a 1:1 scale British Harrier jump jet. Like Mi-kun, it has no weapons and its own A.I. It also has no interior, so Misora must ride on the outside, usually on its wings.

Nah-chan
Sylvia's toy-like support mecha, a 1:1 scale DSV Shinkai 6500 deep sea submersible. Unlike the other two mecha it has a cockpit inside. The cockpit is a small living area where Sylvia lives. It has two extendable mechanical pincers to grip things with.

Seiryuu
(Blue Dragon) is Colonel Kagome Mishima's tank support mecha which is only 30% complete due to budget restrictions.

Cosmic Tama-chan
The turtle-like Cute Alien who two years prior taken and cared for by a group of female Japanese Defense officers. Before leaving Cosmic Tama-chan laid four egg like capsules. Three of which inside are the alien technology badges that is given to Mao-chan, Misora and Sylvie. The fourth egg contained a warning that Earth is targeted by Cute Aliens.

Powers and abilities

According to the anime, the United Defense Force badges have the ability to summon the Light of Kusanagi. Originally hatched from Cosmic Tama-chan, the badges are able to download "Type-2 Gear" onto the wearer, which consists of a red band uniform and a double-ended baton.

The baton is summoned by a crystal orb that's tucked into a pouch in the belt of the uniform. The orb duplicates itself and connects to form the baton.

Mao-chan's green badge represents the Type-2 Ground Gear. Late in the anime, it gives Mao-chan roller blades to make up for her inability to run.

Misora-chan's blue badge represents Type-2 Flight Gear. These give Misora a pair of wings that she can use to fly, glide or hover.

Sylvia's gray badge represents Type-2 Marine Gear. Unlike the other two, her hat becomes a different shape.

Although the transformations are flashy, the badges don't enhance the physical capabilities of the girls. They can also be used as tracking beacons and communicators to the United Defense Force's headquarters.

It is also apparent in the anime that the badge can be used by anyone who knows how. Yuriko Ōzora is able to use Mao-chan's badge to transform herself into the Lady of Purple Lily.

The girls' main "attack" is the "United Defense Barrier." This focuses the Light of Kusanagi into one end of their batons and form a triangular barrier around the alien. Mao-chan initially begins the procedure by aiming the energy at Misora, who deflects it with her own baton toward Silvia, and then back to Mao-chan.

Mao usually trips and fails to catch the energy beam, which results in a good chunk of Japan to be decimated. In the manga, there is an extra chapter that supposedly takes place in an alternate future ten years later where under Rikushiro, they activate the barrier and Mao-chan misses her mark. With age comes more power, and the Light of Kusanagi is now powerful enough to obliterate planets. As a result, the planet Earth is destroyed.

Episodes

External links
Starchild Mao-chan website
 
Anime Fringe review

2002 anime television series debuts
2003 manga
Anime with original screenplays
Extraterrestrials in anime and manga
IG Port franchises
Geneon USA
Magical girl anime and manga
Ken Akamatsu
Kodansha manga
Japan Self-Defense Forces in fiction
Alien invasions in comics
Shōnen manga
Xebec (studio)